The Jamaica national bobsleigh team represents Jamaica in international bobsleighing competitions. The men's team debut in the 1988 Winter Olympic Games four-man bobsleigh in Calgary, Alberta, was received as underdogs in a cold weather sport represented by a nation with a tropical environment. Jamaica returned to the Winter Olympics in the two-man bobsleigh in 1992, 1994, 1998, 2002, 2014, and 2022; a women's team debuted in 2018.

Beginnings

The debut team, consisting of Devon Harris, Dudley Stokes, Michael White, Freddy Powell, and last minute replacement Chris Stokes, qualified at the 1988 Winter Olympic Games in Calgary, Alberta. Their coach was Howard Siler, an Olympic bobsledder for the United States in 1972 and 1980. Their "underdog" status as an unlikely competitor in a cold weather sport represented by a nation with a tropical environment quickly gained them popularity at the Games. They had little experience in the sport and had to appeal to other teams for basic equipment in order to compete; sporting camaraderie across national boundaries followed. In the third out of four runs, they lost control of the sleigh, crashed, and did not officially finish. Dudley Stokes and Michael White entered the two-man bobsleigh event, finishing 30th out of 41 teams.

Evolution
The team returned to the Olympics at the 1992 Winter Olympic Games in Albertville, France, and finished 25th. They qualified for the 1994 Winter Olympic Games in Lillehammer, Norway. Critics were stunned when they finished in 14th place, ahead of the United States, Russia, Australia, and France.

At the 2000 World Push in Monaco the team won the gold medal.

At the 2002 Winter Olympic Games in Salt Lake City, the 2-man team of Winston Watts (pilot) and Lascelles Brown (brakeman) set the Park City bobsled track record and the Olympic record for the push-start segment of the 2-man race at 4.78 seconds.  Jamaica failed to qualify for the 2006 Winter Olympic Games in Turin, Italy, and the 2010 Winter Olympic Games in Vancouver, Canada. The two-man bobsled team qualified for the 2014 Winter Olympic Games in Sochi, Russia.

Jamaica National Women's Bobsleigh team
Jamaica competed in women's bobsleigh, with a crew of two coached by Norwegian Trond Knaplund, consisting of pilot Porscha Morgan and Wynsome Cole on brakes, winning World Push titles in 2000 and 2001. They achieved the fastest push times in all runs, resulting in a landslide victory. These women initiated the Jamaican women bobsleigh team/program and were seen as contenders in the sport. The programme suffered a setback because of lack of funding, and brakeman Wynsome Cole suffered injuries due to a crash, resulting in the team having to withdraw from a few of the competitions.

The team returned to competition at the 2014 Winter Olympic Games, with KayMarie Jones and Salcia Slack competing in a North American Cup race in November 2014, ending an over 10 year absence of a Jamaican female crew in international competition. One of the athletes on the revived team was Natalia Stokes, daughter and niece of former Jamaican bobsledders Chris and Dudley Stokes.

Modern day
Jamaica qualified for the 2014 Winter Olympic Games, lacked funding, but within two days the cryptocurrency Dogecoin community raised on the team's behalf $30,000 of the approximately $40,000. An online campaign was set up, seeking to raise an additional $80,000 through the crowdfunding platform Tilt. The campaign closed on 22 January 2014, and surpassed the target goal having collected $129,687.

Following the 2014 Winter Olympic Games, Todd Hays, former Olympic medalist and former coach of the Dutch and United States bobsleigh teams, was appointed head coach and technical director of the Jamaican team. However he had to leave his role after one season due to a lack of funds to pay his salary, although he continued to work with the team in an unofficial capacity. Ahead of the 2018 Winter Olympic Games in Pyeongchang, South Korea, the Jamaican Bobsleigh Federation invested significantly in the team, buying a new sled for the women's crew of Jazmine Fenlator-Victorian and Carrie Russell, and filling a number of coaching positions, with former British, Dutch and Brazilian coach Jo Manning becoming High-Performance Director, former Olympic and World Champion Sandra Kiriasis joining as driving coach and Dudley Stokes being appointed as coach responsible for performance, mental preparation and general logistics. In January 2018, the Jamaica women's team qualified for the 2018 Winter Olympic Games. However the men's team missed out on Olympic qualification by one position in the world rankings. Days ahead of the start of bobsleigh training at the Games, Kiriasis parted ways with the Jamaica Bobsleigh Federation after she was told she would be demoted from her position as driver coach to the role of track and performance analyst. On 21 February Fenlator-Victorian and Russell finished 19th in the two-woman Olympic bobsleigh event.

Current
The current team:

2018 Winter Olympic team:

Olympics record

Monobob

Two-man

Two-woman

Four-man

In popular culture 
The 1988 team inspired the reggae parody song "Jamaican Bobsled" by The Rock 'n' Roll Animals, played on the GTR radio station and later released on the CD Yatta, Yatta, Yatta. The song was recorded after Jamaica had announced that they would be entering a bobsledding team into the Olympics, but before the Olympics had actually started; nevertheless, the lyrics accurately predict that the team would crash during one of their runs.

In 1993,  Disney released Cool Runnings, a film loosely based on and inspired by the team's experience in the four-man Bobsleigh at the 1988 Winter Olympics event, at the 1988 Winter Olympic Games.

The 1988 four-man team were referenced in the 1999 Futurama episode Xmas Story.

The 2014 team was the inspiration for "The Bobsled Song" written by Sidney Mills from Steel Pulse, Jon Notar, and Groove Guild. The music video features 8-bit graphics. The song is timed to sync up to the team's Sochi bobsled run. The song was widely shown on television Olympics coverage in the lead-up to the team's run.

See also
 Tropical nations at the Winter Olympics
 Nigerian bobsled team

References

External links
 Jamaica Bobsleigh Federation  official website
 Video Interview With Devon Harris
 Devon Harris' interview with John Kline of Elevation Radio
 Visa 2010 Winter Olympics  featuring photos and footage of Jamaica's debut at the 1988 Winter Olympic Games.

National bobsleigh teams
National team
Bobsled
Bobsled
1988 establishments in North America